Asari may refer to:

The Asari are a caste of artisans and craftsmen who do metal working and make jewelry. They are also involved in the construction trades of carpentry and masonry. They are followers of Vishvakarman, the Hindu god of craftsmen and architects, from whom all Asari claimed to descend from. They are found in the Vedas where according to legend they made chariots and weapons for kings and rajas. The jewelry and metal items made by the Asari are often used in Hindu rituals and ceremonies.

Fiction
 Asari, a fictional race in the video game series Mass Effect
 Asari-chan, a Japanese manga series by Mayumi Muroyama

Places
Asari (crater), on the dwarf planet Ceres
Asari, Latvia, a neighbourhood of Jūrmala, Latvia
Asari-Toru, a Rivers State, Nigeria

People
Junko Asari (born 1969), a Japanese marathon runner
, Japanese ski jumper
Mujahid Dokubo-Asari, jailed leader of the Niger Delta People's Volunteer Force

Other uses
Asari, the Japanese term for the saltwater clam species Venerupis philippinarum

Japanese-language surnames